Ludwig Christian Erk (6 January 1807, Wetzlar – 25 November 1883, Berlin) was a German musicologist, music teacher, academic, composer and folk-song collector.

Bibliography 
 Friedrich Wilhelm Bautz: Erk, Ludwig Christian. In: Biographisch-Bibliographisches Kirchenlexikon (BBKL). Band 1, Bautz, Hamm 1975. 2., unveränderte Auflage Hamm 1990, Sp. 1535.
 Max Friedlaender: Erk, Ludwig. In: Allgemeine Deutsche Biographie (ADB). volume 48, Duncker & Humblot, Leipzig 1904, S. 394–397.
 Walter Salmen: Erk, Ludwig Christian. In: Neue Deutsche Biographie (NDB). volume 4, Duncker & Humblot, Berlin 1959, p. 590 f. (digitalised).
 Ernst Schade: Was das Volk zu singen weiss, Ludwig Erk: Leben und Werk eines Liedersammlers, 1992, ImHayn Verl., 

1807 births
1883 deaths
People from Wetzlar
Musicologists from Berlin
German folk-song collectors
19th-century German composers
19th-century German musicologists